Pelican Island is an island off the Kimberley coast of Western Australia.

It is situated in the Joseph Bonaparte Gulf close to the Northern Territory border.

It is an important habitat for many birds including Australian darter, common greenshank, eastern reef egret, rufous night heron, brahminy kite and sacred kingfisher.

See also
Pelican Island (Western Australia) - disambiguation

References

Islands of the Kimberley (Western Australia)